This is a list of numbered county roads in Perth County, Ontario.

For civic-addressing purposes (such as 911), nearly all rural roads in Perth County are numbered. Roads that run east and west, or southeast and northwest, are numbered "Line 1", "Line 2", and so on to "Line 93". Roads that run north and south, or northeast and southwest, are numbered "Road 101", "Road 102", and so on to "Road 183". The roads maintained by the County are numbered in accordance with this scheme; for example, "Perth Line 9" is the section of Line 9 that the county maintains, and "Perth Road 151" is the section of Road 151 that the county maintains.

Main List

Reference:

Minutillo, Carmine. Backroad mapbook, Southwestern Ontario, second edition. Mussio Ventures, 2008.

Perth County Road Map, Perth County Planning and Development Department, 2012

Transport in Perth County, Ontario
Perth